"Humanity" is the second single released by ATB from his album Seven Years: 1998-2005.

CD single Track listings

Humanity (Germany Release) 
 "Humanity" (Airplay mix) - 3:39
 "Humanity" (Energy Club Cut) - 6:56
 "Humanity" (Original Club mix) - 7:05
 "Humanity" (Alex M.O.R.P.H. remix) - 9:06
 "Humanity" (Rank 1 remix) - 8:39
 "Humanity" (Funaki remix) - 4:23

Humanity (US Release)
 "Humanity" (Airplay mix) - 3:39
 "Humanity" (Album Finish mix) - 4:08
 "Humanity" (Energy Club Cut) - 6:56
 "Humanity" (Original Club mix) - 7:05
 "Humanity" (Alex M.O.R.P.H. remix) - 9:06
 "Humanity" (Rank 1 remix) - 8:39
 "Humanity" (Funaki remix) - 4:23
 "Humanity" (Energy mix) - 7:09

2005 singles
ATB songs
Songs written by André Tanneberger
2005 songs